Wang Zhenyi (born November 30, 1924), also known as Zhen-yi Wang, is a Chinese pathophysiologist and hematologist who is a professor emeritus of Medicine and Pathophysiology at the Shanghai Jiao Tong University (SJTU). He is most well known for discovering the cure for acute promyelocytic leukemia while working with Laurent Degos in France, using tretinoin on a trial of 24 patients at Ruijin Hospital in 1986.

Biography
Wang was born in November 1924 in Shanghai, with his ancestral hometown in Yixing, Jiangsu Province. Wang graduated from the Aurora University in Shanghai in 1948 and obtained his M.D. degree.

From 1948 to 1960, Wang completed his residency and worked as a physician at Ruijin Hospital in Shanghai. From 1960 to 1982, Wang taught at Shanghai Second Medical University (now Medical School of Shanghai Jiao Tong University), and was the dean of its pathology and physiology departments. From 1982 to 1984, Wang was the director of the Division of Basic Medicine of Shanghai Second Medical University. From 1984 to 1988, Wang was the president of Shanghai Second Medical University. From 1987 to 1996, Wang was the Director of Shanghai Institute of Hematology (SIH). Wang now is the Honorary Director of SIH.

Wang's research has led to the improved survival of patients with acute promyelocytic leukemia (APML). Wang is the author of more than 300 scientific papers and books.

Chen Zhu (former Minister of Health of China) and his wife Chen Saijuan are both hematologists and former students of Wang.

Awards and honors
 1992, Foreign Member, French Academy of Sciences, France
 1993, Légion d'honneur, France,
 1994, Kettering Prize for Cytodifferentiation Therapy,
 1994, Member, Chinese Academy of Engineering,
 1997, Charles Rodolphe Brupbacher Prize given for his "extraordinary contributions to basic oncological research." Switzerland,
 1998, Prix mondial Cino Del Duca for Science, France,
 2000, Qiushi Distinguished Scientist Award, Hong Kong
 2000, ISI Citation Classic Award,
 2001, Honorary Doctor of Science degree from Columbia University, USA
 2003, Ham-Wasserman Lecturer, American Society of Hematology (ASH).

Wang is also a member of the Chinese Society of Pathophysiology, and the International Society of Fibrinolysis.

See also
 Chen Zhu
 Yuet Wai Kan
 Hematology
 Acute myeloid leukemia

References
 American Society of Hematology
 Charles Rodolphe Brupbacher Foundation Prize, Zurich
 Ham-Wasserman Lecture by Dr. Zhen-yi Wang

1924 births
Living people
20th-century Chinese physicians
21st-century Chinese physicians
Chinese hematologists
Chinese medical researchers
Chinese physiologists
Biologists from Shanghai
Educators from Shanghai
Members of the Chinese Academy of Engineering
Members of the French Academy of Sciences
Physicians from Shanghai
Presidents of universities and colleges in China
Academic staff of Shanghai Jiao Tong University
Academic staff of Shanghai Second Medical University